Rashid Borispiyevich Temrezov is a Russian politician who is the head of Karachay–Cherkessia since 2011.

In 2017 he led tributes to the Soviet agronomist Zuhra Bayramkulova.

References 

1976 births
Living people
People from Cherkessk
Heads of Karachay-Cherkessia
Russian Sunni Muslims